Hannawald is a German surname. Notable people with the surname include:

Ernst Hannawald (born 1959), German actor
Sven Hannawald (born 1974), German ski jumper, motor racing driver, and footballer

German-language surnames